In railway and rapid transit parlance, the Spanish solution is a station layout with two railway platforms, one on each side of the track, which allows for separate platforms for boarding and alighting.

The "Spanish solution" is used in several stations of the Madrid Metro (e.g. Avenida de América) and Barcelona Metro (e.g. Sant Andreu).

Description
This platform arrangement allows the separation of passenger streams by using one platform only for boarding, and the other one only for alighting. The separate designation of platforms for boarding and alighting has been proven effective at reducing dwell time at stations with high passenger numbers.

The Spanish solution is most commonly applied at high-frequency underground metro stations. Stations are sometimes retrofitted to include a Spanish solution layout to expand the capacity of existing stations when there is no space to widen the existing platform, an issue that can occur in island platform configurations.

To encourage passengers to exit to the correct platform, arriving trains typically first open their doors facing the platform for alighting passengers, and then open the doors for boarding passengers after a slight delay.

Examples
An example of the Spanish Solution is the Karlsplatz (Stachus) station on the Munich S-Bahn, which has island platforms for boarding and side platforms for alighting.

Gallery

See also 
 Cross-platform interchange
 Interchange station

References

External links

Rapid transit
Railway platforms